The following is a list of Brisbane Bears leading goalkickers in each of their seasons in the Australian Football League (formerly the Victorian Football League).

References
Brisbane Bears Goalkicking Records

Goalkickers
Australian rules football-related lists
Brisbane sport-related lists